The Korean Social Democratic Party (KSDP) is a political party in North Korea, allied with the ruling Workers' Party of Korea. It was formed on 3 November 1945 as the Korean Democratic Party by a diverse group of medium and small entrepreneurs, merchants, handicraftsmen, petite bourgeoisie, peasants, and Christians. The party's founders were motivated by anti-imperialist and anti-feudal aspirations, and aimed to eliminate the legacy of Japanese rule and build a new democratic society. The party came more under the influence of the government over time and today is a part of the Democratic Front for the Reunification of Korea, a nominal alliance of parties dominated by the ruling Workers' Party of Korea.

History

The party was established in Pyongyang by Cho Man-sik on 3 November 1945 as the Korean Democratic Party (조선민주당). It quickly gained support from Christian businessmen and intellectuals, as well as well-off workers, and had around half a million members after only a few weeks. However, the party was blamed for a series of anti-communist and anti-Soviet riots, and after Cho opposed the results of the Moscow Conference in December (which was supported by the communists and Soviets), he was arrested by the Soviets. Cho's arrest led to many of the party's leaders moving to Seoul in South Korea, where they set up a new headquarters; the party nominated five candidates for the May 1948 Constitutional Assembly elections in South Korea, winning one seat, taken by Yi Yun-yong.

In North Korea the party was taken over by new leadership headed by communist Choe Yong-gon and subsequently joined the pro-Soviet Democratic Front for the Reunification of Korea, after which it became subordinate to the Workers' Party of Korea. Its candidates were given 35 seats in the August 1948 elections and eleven in 1957. In 1959 and 1960 all of the party's offices were shut down by the government. It was subsequently reduced to four seats in 1962 and one in 1967 and 1972. In 1980 it adopted its current name.

From 1982 until the early 2000s, the party distributed its party journal abroad in Korean and English translation. Since the mid-2000s, its party journal is only available online.

The 1990 elections saw the party awarded 51 seats. It had 52 seats following the 1998 elections and 50 after the 2009 elections. It retained the same number of seats in the 2014 elections.

The party was headed by Pak Yong-il until his death in 2022. The previous chairman was Kim Yong-dae. , the party had more than 30,000 members.

Criticism of government policy 
Contrary to its usual portrayal in official propaganda, for a brief time in the mid-to-late 1980s, the party's journal featured texts raising criticism of government policies. These included calls to give more support to people with disabilities or improve the petition system, as well as raising the potential benefits of allowing more than one candidate per election district and allowing voters to decide which would be elected. It is believed these statements may have been linked to a brief liberalization of North Korea's justice system that occurred around the same time.

Ideology
The Korean Democratic Party was renamed the Korean Social Democratic Party in 1981. Since then, the party has been used in North Korean propaganda targeting foreign sympathizers. Because of the ostensible social democratic ideology, which is intelligible to foreigners, the Social Democratic Party is used in such propaganda much more than the other legal minor party, Chondoist Chongu Party. In the 1990s, the KSDP published periodical magazines in Korean and English. These magazines sought to simultaneously convince foreigners that North Korea has a multi-party system with independent parties but also that, paradoxically, minor parties in North Korea support the Workers' Party of Korea without reservation.

Nominally, the party seeks to establish a social democracy befitting Korea's historical conditions and national characteristics. The party's motto is "independence, sovereignty, democracy, peace and the defence of human rights".

It is part of the Democratic Front for the Reunification of Korea, a coalition with the other two legal parties in North Korea, the Chondoist Chongu Party and the Workers' Party of Korea.

Election results

North Korea

Supreme People's Assembly

South Korea

Vice President

Constitutional Assembly

See also

 List of political parties in North Korea

Notes

References

Further reading

External links
  at Ryomyong, the website of the National Reconciliation Council 

1945 establishments in Korea
Anti-imperialist organizations
Political parties established in 1945
Social democratic parties in Asia
Socialist parties in North Korea
Workers' Party of Korea